This is a list of operators of the Douglas DC-4, Douglas C-54, Canadair North Star and Douglas R5D.

Civil operators

 Aden Airways

 Air Algerie

 Seagreen Air Transport 

 Aerolíneas Argentinas
 Aerotransportes Entre Rios
 Aerovias Halcon
  (FAMA) Air Express
 Ansett-ANA
 Australian National Airways
 British Commonwealth Pacific Airlines
 Pacific Air Freighters
 Qantas
 Trans Australia Airlines

 Carib West Airways

 SABENA
 Avions Fairey
 Belgian International Air Services

 Frigorifico Reyes

 King of Burundi

 Air Cameroun (Societie Anonyme des Avions Meyer et Compagnie)
 Cameroon Airlines

 Air North
 Buffalo Airways
 Eldorado Aviation
 Canadian Pacific Airlines 
 National Research Council
 Trans-Canada Airlines 
 World Wide Airways
 Curtiss Reid Flying Services Canada
 Kenting Aviation
 Maritime Central Airways
 Millardair
 Nordair
 Pacific Western
 Soundair
 Transair

 Air Tchad

 China Airlines
 Civil Air Transport

 Avianca
 SATENA

 Air Congo

 
 Det Danske Luftfartselskab (DDL)
 Flying Enterprise - Canadair North Star

 Aerovias Ecuatorianas

 
 TACA International Airlines

 Air France
 

 Transgabon

 Aerotour
 All-Air
 
 LTU International
 Luftreederei Karl Herfurtner
 
 Transportflug

 Olympic Airways

Aviateca

 Cathay Pacific Airways

 Indian Airlines

 Icelandair
 Loftleidir

 Aer Turas
 Shannon Air

 El Al

 Alitalia

 Air Afrique

 Japan Air Lines

 East African Airways

 Middle East Airlines
 Trans Mediterranean Airways

 Luxair

 Air Madagascar

 Air Mauritanie

 Aerovias Guest
 Líneas Aéreas Unidas Mexicanas

 KLM
 Martin's Air Charter

LANICA (Lineas Aereas de Nicaragua S.A.)

 Air Niger

 Det Norske Luftfartsselskap (DNL)

 Aerovias Internacional Balboa
 Copa Airlines

 Paraguayan Airways Service 
 Lloyd Aéreo Paraguayo S.A.

 Faucett Perú

Philippine Air Lines

 SkyClass Aviation 
 Africair
 Safair
 South African Airways
 Trek Airways

 Korean Air Lines

 Air Vietnam

 Aviaco
 Iberia
 Spantax
 Trans Europa

 Scandinavian Airlines
 Svensk Interkontinental Lufttrafik

 Balair

 Syrian Airways

 Thai Airways

 ACE Freighters
 Air Charter Limited
 Channel Airways
 Dan-Air
 Eagle Airways
 Invicta Airways
 Lloyd International
 Skyways
 Starways
 Air Links
 BOAC
 British Midland
 Derby Airways
 Keegan Aviation
 Overseas Aviation 
 Transglobe Airways

 Aero Union
 Air America
 American Airlines
 American Export Airlines/American Overseas Airlines
 ARAMCO
 Biegert Aviation
 Berlin Airlift Historical Foundation (http://www.spiritoffreedom.org)
 Capital Airlines 
 Chicago and Southern Airlines 
 Eastern Airlines
 Matson Airlines
 National Airlines
 Northwest Airlines
 Pan American World Airways
 Pacific Southwest Airlines
 Santa Fe Skyways (owned by Santa Fe Railroad)
 Transocean Air Lines
 Trans World Airlines 
 United Airlines
  Westair Transport
 Waterman Airlines
 Western Airlines
 Zantop

 Linea Expressa Bolivar

Notes
   Canadair North Star operator
  Ansett-ANA was also an original operator of the Aviation Traders ATL-98 Carvair conversion of the DC-4/C-54

Military operators
(Douglas C-54 unless specified)

Argentine Air Force
Argentine Naval Aviation

Belgian Air Force - One former R5D1 from 1950–1971, also operated one DC-4.

TAM – Transporte Aéreo Militar - one former USAF VC-54D and one C-54G both bought in 1973.

Força Aérea Brasileira - Twelve C-54Gs serialled FAB 2400 to FAB 2411, flown by the "1º/2º Grupo de Transporte" between 1960–1968

Royal Khmer Aviation (AVRK) - One C-54B used as a VIP transport, flown by the "Transport and Liaison Group" (French: Groupe d'Liaison et Transport – GLT) between 1960-1970.

 Royal Canadian Air Force - Canadair North Star

 Chadian Air Force - received from France in 1976

 Colombian Air Force

 Fuerza Aérea del Ejército de Cuba - Photographic evidence of one registered 614. There are reports of a second one registered 615. Unknown origin.

Royal Danish Air Force - Six C-54D/Gs, 1959–1977 

 Fuerza Aérea Dominicana - Photographic evidence of two aircraft registered 3105 –named 'San Isidro'– and 3106. Unknown origin.

 Air Force of El Salvador - Canadair North Star

Ethiopian Air Force - One former USAF C-54D from 1966 and one former US DoT C-54G in 1969.

French Air Force - One C-54E donated in 1945 and transferred to the Navy in 1960. One C-54A 1961-1975.
French Naval Aviation - One C-54E transferred from the Air Force in 1960, destroyed in 1982. One C-54B 1962-1969.

Fuerza Aérea Guatemalteca - One received late 1964 and registered 800. Sold to Honduras as FAH-799 in 1973.

Honduras Air Force

Icelandic Coast Guard

Israeli Air Force

Mexican Air Force - 7 C-54B

 Netherlands East Indies
Royal Netherlands East Indies Army Air Force - four C-54As operated in 1946.

Niger Air Force - One C-54B 1968-1974.

Peruvian Air Force - Nine delivered in late 1966.

 Portuguese Air Force - Four C-54Ds operated from 1952 supplemented in 1961 by four former C-54As that had been modified to DC-4 standard. In 1965 ten former USAF HC-54Ds were obtained with an additional four as spares.

 Royal Rhodesian Air Force - Canadair North Star

 Chinese Nationalist Air Force - former USAF aircraft 2 × C-54D (one bought in 1965 and one in 1966),  and 1 × C-54G (bought in 1968)

Royal Saudi Air Force - one former Saudia C-54A from 1960 and now preserved.

 Republic of Korea Air Force

 South African Air Force

Spanish Air Force - Four former C-54Ds given to Spain by the USAF in 1959 were later supplemented by another 13 second-hand aircraft which included C-54, C-54A, C-54B, C-54E, C-54G and 5D-3s.

 
 Royal Thai Air Force

Turkish Air Force - three C-54Ds from 1966-1976.

Royal Air Force - 10 C-54Ds transferred from USAF under lend-lease in 1945 and returned in 1946. One special fitted C-54B for the use by Winston Churchill transferred in 1944 and returned in 1945.
No. 232 Squadron RAF
No. 246 Squadron RAF
Metropolitan Communications Squadron

United States Army Air Forces
US Air Force - Douglas C-54
United States Navy - Douglas R5D
US Marine Corps - R5D
US Coast Guard - R5D

Venezuelan Air Force - One C-54A 1949-1955.

See also
 Aviation Traders Carvair

References
Notes

Bibliography

 
 Blewett, R. Survivors. Coulsden, UK: Aviation Classics, 2007. .
 

 Pearcy, Arthur. Douglas Propliners: DC-1–DC-7. Shrewsbury, UK: Airlife Publishing, 1995. .
 Pickler, Ron and Larry Milberry. Canadair: The First 50 Years. Toronto: CANAV Books, 1995. .
 Milberry, Larry. The Canadair North Star''. Toronto: CANAV Books, 1982. .

The PSA History/Oldtimers Page

External links

 Canadair DC4M North Star
 Moose Jaw crash at virtualmuseum.ca
 Berlin Airlift Historical Foundation - Operates C-54 "Spirit of Freedom" as flying Berlin Airlift Museum
 Air Force Association page on C-54
 Air Force Museum page on the VC-54C
 Warbird Alley: C-54 page
 Cockpit View of C-54 During Landing/Taxi
 Boeing McDonnell Douglas page on DC-4
 The last passenger certified & built DC-4s in the world
 Vintage Wings of Canada Canadair North Star showing RR Merlin installation
 Loading Santa Fe Skyways DC-4 refrigerated cargo aircraft.
 Santa Fe Skyways reconverted DC-4 refrigerated cargo aircraft.
 Composite photograph of Santa Fe Skyway Inc. DC-4.

Operators
DC-4